Philbertia alfredensis is a species of sea snail, a marine gastropod mollusk in the family Raphitomidae.

This is a taxon inquirendum.

Description

Distribution
This marine species has been found at Port Alfred, South Africa

References

Raphitomidae
Gastropods described in 1932